Holidays on Ice is a 1997 collection of essays and stories about Christmas, some new and some previously published, by David Sedaris.

Sedaris was named by The Economist as one of the funniest writers alive. This is one of his first works, which was subsequently re-released with additional new passages.

The most popular essay is “Santaland Diaries”, which is Sedaris’ take on working as an elf at a department store grotto during Christmas season.

"Holidays on Ice" was re-released in October 2008 by publisher, Little, Brown & Company. The book has 176 pages.

Contents

SantaLand Diaries 
"SantaLand Diaries" recounts Sedaris' experiences working as an elf at Macy's department store. The essay was originally broadcast on NPR, and is also included in Sedaris' first book Barrel Fever.

Season's Greetings to Our Friends and Family!!! 
A Christmas letter from the Dunbar clan detailing matriarch Mrs. Dunbar's slow descent into insanity during the holiday season — belied by her insistently cheerful tone — as she is forced to cope with the discovery of her husband's infidelity, the resultant prostitute stepdaughter left in their care, and her drug-addict daughter's premature pregnancy. Also first published in Barrel Fever.

Dinah, the Christmas Whore 
Sedaris recalls the Christmas that he was taken on a late-night ride downtown by his sister, Lisa, to rescue a prostitute from her abusive boyfriend.  This story was also published in Sedaris' 1997 book Naked.

Front Row Center with Thaddeus Bristol 
A review of the local grade school's Christmas pageant.

Based on a True Story 
Where a member of the media begs a church congregation for information on a heartbreaking story.

Christmas Means Giving 
Where battling neighbors try to outdo each other with holiday generosity.

See also
 List of Christmas-themed literature

References

External links
Holidays on Ice on GoogleBooks

1997 non-fiction books
1997 short story collections
American essay collections
American short story collections
Little, Brown and Company books
Works by David Sedaris
Christmas essays
Christmas short story collections